Maxim Sergeyevich Tsvetkov (born 3 January 1992) is a Russian biathlete. He competes in the Biathlon World Cup, and represented Russia at the Biathlon World Championships 2016.

Biathlon results
All results are sourced from the International Biathlon Union.

Olympic Games

References

External links

1992 births
Living people
Skiers from Moscow
Russian male biathletes
Biathlon World Championships medalists
People from Vologda Oblast
Biathletes at the 2022 Winter Olympics
Olympic biathletes of Russia
Medalists at the 2022 Winter Olympics
Olympic medalists in biathlon
Olympic bronze medalists for the Russian Olympic Committee athletes
20th-century Russian people
21st-century Russian people